Christopher Kummer (born March 18, 1975) in Frankfurt) is a German economist, currently serving as a professor of finance at Hult International Business School.

Life 
After graduating from Benedictine School in Engelberg, Switzerland in 1995 he completed his graduate studies in Strategy and Finance in 1999 at the University of St. Gallen with a dissertation supervised by Georg von Krogh. He received his PhD from the Technical University of Berlin in 2005 with a dissertation on mergers and acquisitions.

From 2004 to 2014 he was a professor at Webster University Vienna where he founded the Institute for Mergers, Acquisitions and Alliances (IMAA) and began a professional partnership with Michael E. Porter. As an advisor he led the HR Transaction Services unit from 2007 to 2009 at PricewaterhouseCoopers in Zurich, Switzerland. Since 2012 he is a professor of finance at Hult International Business School.

Selected publications 
 Mult-headquartered firms. A strategic analysis. 1999.
 International Mergers & Acquisitions Activity., 2005.

See also
 Mergers and acquisitions

References

External links 
 Publications Google Scholar
 Institute for Mergers, Acquisitions and Alliances (IMAA)
 Research Gate

1975 births
Living people
Hult International Business School faculty
Webster University faculty
University of St. Gallen alumni
Technical University of Berlin alumni